The Marland Filling Station at 102 South Wood in Hominy, Oklahoma was built in 1922.  It was listed on the National Register of Historic Places in 2002.

It was designed by the Marland Oil Company.  It is a small triangular red brick building with three  sides.

The NRHP nomination explained its importance:The distinctive, triangular building was a pioneer in Hominy - the first gas station constructed with the idea of associating a building with a particular product. As a standardized design, the Marland Filling Station represents a new wave in corporate advertising that utilizes the look of the building to create an identity with consumers. It is also reflective of the growth in importance of the automobile to this Osage County town.

References

Gas stations on the National Register of Historic Places in Oklahoma
National Register of Historic Places in Osage County, Oklahoma
Neoclassical architecture in Oklahoma
Commercial buildings completed in 1922